The Kalleby Runestone is an enigmatic Iron Age runestone inscribed in Proto-Norse with the Elder Futhark:

þrawijan * haitinaz was

This short text has been the subject of several interpretations where þrawijan, which means "yearning", is interpreted as either a name or an epithet. The words haitinaz was mean "was named", and so the text is open to various interpretations, such as:
Yearning was imposed (on him).
Þrawija's (monument).
(I/he) was commanded/called.
(I/He) was promised to þrawija.

See also
List of runestones

Sources
Rundata
The runestone on the site of the Swedish National Heritage Board.

Proto-Norse language
Runestones in Bohuslän
Elder Futhark inscriptions